Molinadendron is a genus of the Hamamelidaceae family, order Saxifragales, containing three reported species: Molinadendron guatemalense, Molinadendron hondurense, and Molinadendron sinaloense. Relatives include witch-hazel and winter-hazel.

Molinadendron sinaloense is an evergreen tree native to the woodlands of western Mexico.  It reaches a height of up to 20 ft (6.2 m). Leaves are oval, tapered, 3-6 inch (7.6-15.2 cm) in length, opening purplish and coppery on graceful branches.

References

Hamamelidaceae
Saxifragales genera